Vladimir “Vlado” Brinovec (16 June 1941 – August 2006) was a Slovenian swimmer who competed in the 1960 Summer Olympics. He was born in Kranj.

References

1937 births
2006 deaths
Slovenian male freestyle swimmers
Olympic swimmers of Yugoslavia
Swimmers at the 1960 Summer Olympics
Sportspeople from Kranj
Yugoslav male freestyle swimmers
Mediterranean Games gold medalists for Yugoslavia
Swimmers at the 1959 Mediterranean Games
Mediterranean Games medalists in swimming